Apollinarius was a first or second century AD astrologer who wrote in Greek. He is a source for Vettius Valens and Galen.

Notes

Ancient Greek astronomers